Wentworth Primary School is a primary school in Dartford, Kent, England. In 2017, the Gemili block (named after Olympic sprint athlete and alumni Adam Gemili) was opened.

History
The school was opened in a new building on 13 April 1951. On 1 January 1999 it amalgamated its infant and junior schools, and it became an academy on 1 February 2012. The Adam Gemili block, including 8 new schoolrooms, was opened in 2017.

Notable former pupils 
 Keith Richards, musician and songwriter.
 Mick Jagger, musician.
 Adam Gemili, sprint athlete.

References

External links 
 Official website

Primary schools in Kent
Dartford
Academies in Kent